Bicrisia abyssicola is a species of bryozoan within the family Crisiidae. It lives in benthic marine environments within the Arctic Ocean, where it feeds off zooplankton. It has also been found in waters off the United Kingdom and Norway.

References 

Animals described in 1962
Fauna of the Arctic Ocean
Cyclostomatida